The Skook is a novel by JP Miller published in 1984.

Plot summary
The Skook is a novel in which Span Barrmann is trapped in a cave by biker cultists, and must escape with the aid of a fairytale creature called the Skook.

Reception
Dave Langford reviewed The Skook for White Dwarf #79, and stated that "His escape story is an epic quest in little, beset by extinct creatures of the underworld deep. Meanwhile, the minor characters glow with life, from Span's semi-nympho wife, to bikers who outdo Charles Manson in nasty inventiveness. Recommended."

Reviews
Review by Algis Budrys (1985) in The Magazine of Fantasy & Science Fiction, January 1985
Review by Don D'Ammassa (1986) in Science Fiction Chronicle, #77 February 1986
Review by Tom Easton (1986) in Analog Science Fiction/Science Fact, March 1986
Review by Anne Gay (1986) in Fantasy Review, September 1986

References

1984 American novels
1984 fantasy novels
American fantasy novels